Shahan ful, simplified to ful, is a dish common in Sudan, South Sudan, Somalia, Ethiopia  and other parts of the Horn of Africa, which is generally served for breakfast. Believed to originate from Sudan, it is made by slowly cooking fava beans in water. Once the beans have softened, they are crushed into a coarse paste. It is often served with chopped green onions, tomatoes, and hot green peppers, as well as yogurt, feta cheese, olive oil, tesmi, berbere, lemon juice, cumin, and chili pepper. It is typically eaten without the aid of utensils accompanied with a bread roll. It is popular during the Ramadan season and during the various Lents.

The dish is similar to ful medames, a popular dish of Egypt.

See also
 List of African dishes
 List of legume dishes

References
 Jennifer Bain. "Spicy Ethiopian Fava Beans." Toronto Star. Thu Mar 28, 2013
 "Sudan." The Complete Guide to National Symbols and Emblems: Volume 2. Greenwood Press, Dec 1, 2009 pg. 638

Arab cuisine
Sudanese cuisine
South Sudanese cuisine
Ethiopian cuisine
Legume dishes
Eritrean cuisine